Partie may refer to:

Partie (cards), a session or complete game in cards
Douglas Partie (born 1961), American volleyball player
Partita, or partie, a single-instrumental piece of music, or dance suite

See also

Parti (disambiguation)
Party (disambiguation)
Partial (disambiguation)
 Chef de partie, a chef in charge of a particular area of production in a restaurant